Upstate University Hospital is a 752-bed non-profit, teaching hospital located in Syracuse, New York. Upstate University Hospital is a part of the Upstate Health System, as the flagship hospital in the system. As the hospital is a teaching hospital, it is affiliated with the Norton College of Medicine at State University of New York Upstate Medical University. The hospital is also an American College of Surgeons verified Level 1 Trauma Center, the only in the region and one of 21 in New York. Attached to the hospital is the Upstate Golisano Children's Hospital that treats infants, children, teens, and young adults aged 0–21.

History
While the affiliated medical school, Norton College of Medicine, had existed for years prior, the plan to operate a medical center affiliated with the university was thought of as far back as 1915 when university Dean, John Heffron proposed the idea.

Years later on May 19, 1951, the plans for the new University Hospital were approved, laying the groundwork for the construction of the hospital.

On July 1, 1961, ground was broken on the construction for the Upstate University Hospital. The hospital was later opened in 1965 with 375 beds under the name "State University Hospital" at a total cost of $20 million ($165 million in today's funds.)

In June 1976, hospital officials established the Upstate Medical Center Foundation to accept donations to help advance patient care to underserved communities. In 1984, the foundation funded the construction of a new pediatric intensive care unit with a capacity of 7 beds at a cost of $1 million.

In November 1994 the new East Wing of Upstate University Hospital is opened and moved into using a staggered occupancy plan.

Years later, in 2003 plans to expand the East Wing vertically 5 floors were approved with a planned cost of $84 million. In 2006 the expanded East wing opened becoming the Upstate Golisano Children's Hospital thanks to a $6 million gift from local philanthropist, Tom Golisano. Ultimately the new children's hospital opened in 2009 at a cost of $150 million with 71 private rooms and 87,000 square feet of space.

During the 2020 2020 COVID-19 pandemic, Upstate University Hospital introduced limited strict visiting policies and introduced updated visiting guidelines to help stop the spread of the virus through hospital visits. Later on, hospital officials announced that Upstate Golisano Children's Hospital would treat non-covid adult patients, expanding their age limit to age 30.

In light of the COVID-19 pandemic, on August 19, 2021, SUNY Upstate was awarded $2 million from the Federal Communications Commission (FCC) to help upgrade and support its tele-health infrastructure with a focus on video consults and remote patient monitoring as part of its electronic medical record (EMR) system.

Upstate Golisano Children's Hospital 
Upstate Golisano Children's Hospital (GCH) is an acute care children's hospital in Syracuse, New York. GCH features 71 pediatric beds. The hospital provides comprehensive pediatric specialties and subspecialties to infants, children, teens, and young adults aged 0–21 throughout the region. The hospital also sometimes treats adults that require pediatric care. The hospital shares the rooftop helipad for the attached Upstate University Hospital and is an ACS verified level I pediatric trauma center, one of the only ones in the region. The hospital also features a regional pediatric intensive-care unit.

A few blocks away from Golisano Children's Hospital is the Ronald McDonald House of Central New York, which has 25 guest rooms to serve families of pediatric patients aged 21 years or younger in treatment at Golisano Children's and the nearby Crouse Hospital.

Upstate Community Hospital 
Community General Hospital opened is doors on January 1, 1963. In 2011, Upstate Medical University acquired Community General Hospital, and was renamed "Upstate University Hospital at Community Campus" on July 7, 2011.

Upstate Community Hospital offers a range of services including its orthopedic program, spine surgery, bariatric surgery and maternity services. Upstate Community Hospital has a medical staff of 460 physicians who provide obstetric, psychiatric, orthopedic, gynecological and medical/surgical services to 12,000 patients each year. The hospital also offers a wide range of outpatient and community health education services, including nutrition counseling and weight loss programs.

Upstate Cancer Center 
Upstate Medical University completed the construction of the Upstate Cancer Center, a five-story $74-million facility, in July 2014 and expanded it in 2018. Upstate is the region's only provider for children who have cancer. Upstate also is part of the Children's Oncology Group.

Upstate's programs at the Cancer Center include:

 Breast Cancer Program
 Gynecology Oncology Program
 Head & Neck Program
 Liver, Gallbladder, Pancreas Cancer Program
 Neuro Oncology Program
 Prostate Cancer Program
 Thyroid Cancer Program
 Thoracic Oncology Program (TOP)

The Upstate Cancer Center is accredited by the American College of Surgeons: Commission on Cancer (ACOS CoC).

Awards 
In 2019 and 2020 the hospital received "Stroke Gold Plus Award," "Heart Failure Gold Plus Quality Award," and the "Resuscitation Bronze Award" from the American Heart Association and the American Stroke Association.

In December 2020, Upstate announced that the American College of Surgeons National Surgical Quality Improvement Program (NSQIP) named Upstate Community Hospital as one of just 89 facilities nationwide for meritorious outcomes for surgical care. Upstate also has earned DNV accreditation as a Center of Excellence for Hip and Knee and as Blue Distinction Center, which also was achieved by its spine program. The pancreatic surgery program is recognized by the National Pancreatitis Foundation as a National Center of Excellence, and the breast cancer program is accredited nationally. In 2018, NSQIP recognized Upstate University Hospital as a high performer regarding care of high-risk surgical patients.

In January 2021, Upstate University Hospital was designated a Magnet hospital from the American Nurses Association(ANA), a designation that recognizes excellent nursing care.

The hospital received "High Performing" in both heart failure and COPD on the 2020-21 U.S. News & World Report: Best Hospital rankings.

Upstate is among the 1% of accredited cancer programs in the country who have achieved the Outstanding Achievement Award for four consecutive survey cycles.

See also 
 SUNY Upstate Medical University
 Syracuse
 Syracuse University
 List of children's hospitals in the United States

References

External links 
 Upstate University Hospital website
 Golisano Children's Hospital website

Teaching hospitals in New York (state)
Hospitals in New York (state)
Hospital buildings completed in 1965
Hospital buildings completed in 1994
Hospital buildings completed in 2009
Trauma centers